Manbazar Assembly constituency is an assembly constituency in Purulia district in the Indian state of West Bengal. It is reserved for scheduled tribes.

Overview
As per orders of the Delimitation Commission, No. 243 Manbazar Assembly constituency (ST) is composed of the following: Manbazar I and Puncha community development blocks; Chatumadar, Daldali and Manguria Lalpur gram panchayats of Hura community development block.

Manbazar Assembly constituency is part of No. 35 Purulia (Lok Sabha constituency).

Members of Legislative Assembly

Election results

2021

2016

2011

.# Swing calculated on Congress+Trinamool Congress vote percentages taken together in 2006.

1977-2006
In the 2006 and 2001 state assembly elections, Shamya Pyari Mahato of CPI(M) won the Manbazar assembly seat defeating his nearest rivals Kamakshya Prasad Singh Deo of Trinamool Congress and Sitaram Mahato of Trinamool Congress respectively. Contests in most years were multi cornered but only winners and runners are being mentioned. Kamalakanta Mahato of CPI(M) defeated Sitaram Mahato of Congress in 1996, Nirmal Prasad Mahato of Congress in 1991, and Sitaram Mahato of Congress in 1987 and 1982. Nakul Chandra Mahata of CPI(M) defeated Sitaram Mahato of Congress in 1977.

1957-1972
Sitaram Mahato of Congress won in 1972 and 1971. Girish Mahato of Lok Sewak Sangh/ Independent won in 1969, 1967 and 1962. In 1957 Manbazar was a joint seat with one seat reserved for ST. Chaitan Majhi and Satya Kinkar Mahato, both contesting as Independents, won in 1957.

References

Assembly constituencies of West Bengal
Politics of Purulia district